Ceratocystis pilifera is a fungal plant pathogen.

References

Fungal plant pathogens and diseases
Microascales
Fungi described in 1952